The Holy Land is a concept album, the third gospel album and 30th overall album by country singer Johnny Cash, released on Columbia Records in 1969. He recorded the album inspired by a visit to Israel (the Holy Land of the title) with his wife, June Carter Cash and in fact most of the album consists of on-site recordings made by Cash using a portable tape recorder during a visit describing what he sees as he visits holy sites in and around Jerusalem. The remainder of the album consists of gospel songs. All but three of the songs were written by Cash, though the sole single, "Daddy Sang Bass", which reached No. 1 on the Country charts and remained that spot for six weeks, was penned by Carl Perkins.

The cover has a picture of Cash standing in front of the chapel on top of the Mount of Beatitudes, immediately north of the Sea of Galilee. Some versions of the album had a 3-D picture on the cover.

This album features the final Cash recordings made with original Tennessee Two lead guitarist Luther Perkins before Perkins' death.

The album has been released on CD through Harmony Records in 1999 and later by Columbia as part of the Johnny Cash: The Complete Columbia Album Collection box set in 2012.

The concept of Cash visiting Biblical locations and combining storytelling with music would be revisited twice more in his career for the 1973 soundtrack album The Gospel Road and the 2000 release Return to the Promised Land.

Track listing
All tracks composed by Johnny Cash, except where indicated.

Personnel
Johnny Cash - vocals, guitar
The Carter Family, Jan Howard, The Statler Brothers - backing vocals
Marshall Grant - bass guitar
W.S. Holland - drums
Carl Perkins, Luther Perkins - electric guitar

Additional personnel
Charlie Bragg - engineer
Bob Johnston - producer

Charts
Album – Billboard (United States)

Singles – Billboard (United States)

References

External links
Luma Electronic entry on The Holy Land

Johnny Cash albums
1969 albums
Columbia Records albums
Concept albums
Gospel albums by American artists
Albums produced by Bob Johnston